George Taylor was an English professional football left half who made 220 appearances in the Football League for Bolton Wanderers. He was a reserve for England's 7–0 British Home Championship win over Ireland on 16 November 1938. After his retirement, he served Bolton Wanderers as head coach under Bill Ridding.

References 

English Football League players
Brentford F.C. wartime guest players
English footballers
Association football wing halves
1909 births
Year of death missing
Footballers from Ashton-under-Lyne
Bolton Wanderers F.C. players
Bolton Wanderers F.C. non-playing staff
England youth international footballers